Customs and Border Protection may refer to:

Australian Customs and Border Protection Service
U.S. Customs and Border Protection